The Babylon Union Free School District is a school district in Long Island, New York. The headquarters  are in the village of Babylon in the town of Babylon.

History
On June 21, 1961, the district sold $4,577,855 ($ when adjusted for inflation from the 1961 value) of bonds due to from 1962 to 1990 to an investment banking group. The group was headed by Harriman, Ripley Co., Inc.

In 2007 a redesign of the district's website went online.

Schools

 Babylon Junior-Senior High School
 Babylon Memorial Grade School
 Babylon Elementary School

References

Further reading
 Logan, Janine. "Babylon School District voters reject bond proposals." Babylon Beacon. November 23, 2006. Front Page.
 Logan, Janine. "Babylon School District presents initial budget proposal; next meeting March 22." Babylon Beacon. March 18, 2010. Front Page.

External links

Babylon School District

School districts in New York (state)
Babylon (town), New York
Schools in Suffolk County, New York